Falcons (Icelandic: Fálkar), is the seventh film directed by Friðrik Þór Friðriksson. This film, released in 2002, is mostly in English language.

Plot
It is the story of an ex-convict, Simon (Keith Carradine), who after returning to Iceland where his mother was born, to visit relatives, looks for the loneliest place in the world to commit suicide. In a small village he meets Dúa (Margrét Vilhjálmsdóttir), an Icelandic young lady, who is found to be an interesting, rather strange woman by Simon. Dúa has a caged falcon that she hopes to tame, but they get into trouble as it is illegal to possess this kind of animal in captivity.

In the story, Simon is the embodiment of a jailed bird, one of the falcons and as she is an air sign, they join in a relationship ruled by Simon's belief that she is his illegitimate daughter. Surrounded by tension between them, Simon serves as a protective figure to Dúa, who keeps him from committing suicide.

The couple escape to Hamburg, Germany, to start all over again. The protagonists' behaviours are opposite to each other: Simon is down to earth and finds himself awkward by Dúa's eccentric beliefs in astrology, who considers Simon as a typical Scorpio and thus avoids deepening into a more serious relationship, partly because of the feeling of his paternity.

Dúa's falcon, that she nourished and protected when her uncle found it with a broken wing, has a high value to her, as she considers it last remnant of the beloved life in Iceland. The falcon travels with them on their escape and has a high monetary value. Later, as Dúa wasted their money, Simon tries to sell the falcon in order to cover their expenditure, but he is cheated by some crooked Germans and the falcon is stolen.

Cast
Keith Carradine: Simon
Margrét Vilhjálmsdóttir: Dúa
Ingvar E. Sigurðsson: Jóhann
Magnús Ólafsson: Lobbi
Margrét Ólafsdóttir: Auntie
Friðrik Friðriksson: Young Policeman
Axel Prahl: Car Rental Dealer
Marisa Calcagno: Sabine
Margrét Helga Jóhannsdóttir: Barmaid
Ramin Yazdani: Scarface
Geo von Krogh: Salvation Army Host
Hark Bohm: A Man of the World
Ragnheidur Steindórsdóttir: Nurse
Guðmundur Ólafsson: Doctor
Pétur Ólafsson: Uncle Tóti
Theódór Júlíusson: Bus Driver
Randver Thorláksson: Customs Officer
Zack-Volker Michalowski: Antique Dealer
Jóhanna Vigdís Hjaltadóttir: TV Reporter I
Ómar Ragnarsson: TV Reporter II
Örlygur Kristfinnsson: Gallery Owner
Darren Forman: American I
Glenn Robert Hodge: American II
Rafi Guessous: Doorman
Bernd Gajkowski: Lübeck Bartender
Frank Wieczorek: Sad Looking Man
Werner Karle Jung: Shady Looking Man

Music
The soundtrack was released as a separate CD titled Fálkar. The music composition was mainly by Hilmar Örn Hilmarsson and several important artists who set up a proper atmosphere to the film's plot.

References

External links
 Falcons at the Icelandic Film Corporation web site
 
 

2002 films
English-language Icelandic films
2000s Icelandic-language films
Films directed by Friðrik Þór Friðriksson
Films scored by Hilmar Örn Hilmarsson
Films set in Hamburg
2000s English-language films
Films about astrology
2002 multilingual films
Icelandic multilingual films